Morozovsk is an air base of the Russian Air Force as part of the 4th Air and Air Defence Forces Army, Southern Military District.

The base is home to the 559th Bomber Aviation Regiment which has three squadrons of Sukhoi Su-34 (NATO: Fullback) as part of the 1st Guards Composite Aviation Division.

The 559th was deployed to Primorsko-Akhtarsk (air base) as part of the 2022 Russian invasion of Ukraine.

References

Russian Air Force bases
Buildings and structures in Rostov Oblast